Zgornji Slemen is a settlement in the hills above Selnica in northeastern Slovenia. Part of the settlement is in the Municipality of Selnica ob Dravi and the remainder of the settlement belongs to the City Municipality of Maribor.

References

External links
Zgornji Slemen on Geopedia

Populated places in the Municipality of Selnica ob Dravi